Vestlandhalle is a multi-purpose indoor arena located in Recklinghausen, Germany. It is primarily used for concerts, sports and exhibitions. The facility opened in 1957 and has a capacity of 2,500 people. Notable past performers include The Kinks and Scorpions.

References

External links
 

Music venues in Germany
Indoor arenas in Germany
Sports venues in North Rhine-Westphalia